The mayoral election of 2005 in Pittsburgh, Pennsylvania was held on Tuesday, November 8, 2005. The incumbent mayor, Tom Murphy of the Democratic Party chose not to run for what would have been a record fourth straight term.

Democratic primary
Longtime City Councilman Bob O'Connor, who was defeated in the Democratic primary for mayor in the previous two elections, won nearly half the vote in a four-way contest. With outgoing executive Murphy deeply unpopular due to a 2003 budgetary crisis, O'Connor, a heated Murphy rival, emerged as the top candidate. His victory came against his legislative partner Bill Peduto (who would later become Mayor himself), City Controller Michael Lamb, and former Allegheny County Councilman Louis "Hop" Kenrick.

General election
The general election was uncompetitive, as is the standard in heavily Democratic Pittsburgh, as O'Connor won by 40 points against Republican attorney Joe Weinroth. A total of 59,961 votes were cast.

References

2005 Pennsylvania elections
2005 United States mayoral elections
2005
2000s in Pittsburgh
November 2005 events in the United States